The following is a list of squads for each nation competing at All-Africa Games in Mozambique.

Group A

Head coach:  Kwesi Appiah

Head coach:

Head coach:  Ephraim 'Shakes' Mashaba

|-----
! colspan="9" bgcolor="#B0D3FB" align="left" |

|-----
! colspan="9" bgcolor="#B0D3FB" align="left" |

|-----
! colspan="9" bgcolor="#B0D3FB" align="left" |

Group B

Head coach:

Head coach:

FRED TAMALE '

References

External links
All-Africa Games Official website
Football Tournament Official website

Squads
2011